Yelyzaveta Viktorivna Bryzhina (born November 28, 1989 in Voroshilovgrad) is a Ukrainian sprint athlete, who specializes in the 100 metres.

Her personal best times are 11.42 seconds in the 100 m (outdoor), achieved in May 2016 in Kirovograd; and 22.44 seconds in the 200 metres, achieved in July 2010 in Barcelona.

Personal life
Bryzhina is the daughter of the successful Soviet athletes Olga Bryzhina and Viktor Bryzhin, and sister of Anastasiia Bryzgina.

Bryzhina is a student at the Luhansk Taras Shevchenko National University on a sports scholarship.

Career
Yelizaveta and her mother Olga have achieved the same best performance over 200 m of 22.44 seconds.

Bryzhina was part (with Nataliya Pohrebnyak, Mariya Ryemyen and Olesya Povh) of the Ukrainian women's 4 × 100 m relay, that won gold during the 2010 European Athletics with 42.29 - the fastest time in the world that year. Bryzhina won silver in the (individual) 200 m during this championship when she ran 22.44 (gold went to France's Myriam Soumare).

At the 2012 Olympic Games in London she and her teammates Olesya Povh, Mariya Ryemyen and Hrystyna Stuy took the bronze medals in the 4 x 100 metres relay by setting a new national record.

She served a two-year doping ban for the use of the banned anabolic steroid, Drostanolone, having tested positive at the 2013 World Championships. The ban lasts from 15 August 2013 to 27 August 2015.

References

1989 births
Living people
Sportspeople from Luhansk
Ukrainian female sprinters
Athletes (track and field) at the 2012 Summer Olympics
Athletes (track and field) at the 2016 Summer Olympics
Olympic athletes of Ukraine
Olympic bronze medalists for Ukraine
Ukrainian people of Russian descent
European Athletics Championships medalists
Medalists at the 2012 Summer Olympics
Doping cases in athletics
Ukrainian sportspeople in doping cases
European champions for Ukraine
Olympic bronze medalists in athletics (track and field)
Universiade medalists in athletics (track and field)
Universiade gold medalists for Ukraine
Olympic female sprinters